The 1971–72 Segunda División was the 23rd season of the Mexican Segunda División. The season started on 27 October 1971 and concluded on 26 July 1972. It was won by Atlas.

As of this season, the format of the league changed, there were created two groups, the first and second place of each must play a playoff series for the championship, at the same time the two last teams of each group must play a playoff relegation series. However, the matches between all the teams in the league were maintained.

Changes 
 San Luis was promoted to Primera División.
 Atlas was relegated from Primera División.
 Nuevo León was relegated from Segunda División.
 Lobos Querétaro was promoted from Tercera División.

Teams

Group stage

Group A

Group 1

Results

Promotion Playoff

Final Game

References 

1971–72 in Mexican football
Segunda División de México seasons